The Indian Journal of Dermatology, Venereology and Leprology is a peer-reviewed open-access medical journal published by Scientific Scholar  on behalf of the Indian Association of Dermatologists, Venereologists and Leprologists. The journal covers clinical and experimental dermatology, cutaneous biology, dermatological therapeutics, cosmetic dermatology, dermatopathology, dermatosurgery, pediatric dermatology, photodermatology, and HIV medicine.

Abstracting and indexing 
The journal is indexed in Abstracts on Hygiene and Communicable Diseases, Bioline International, CAB Abstracts, CINAHL, EBSCO, Excerpta Medica/EMBASE, Expanded Academic ASAP, Global Health, Health & Wellness Research Center, Health Reference Center Academic, IndMed, MEDLINE/Index Medicus, SafetyLit, Science Citation Index Expanded, Scopus, SIIC databases, Tropical Diseases Bulletin, and Ulrich's Periodicals Directory.

See also
 Open access in India

External links 
 

Open access journals
Bimonthly journals
English-language journals
Medknow Publications academic journals
Publications established in 1990
Dermatology journals
Academic journals associated with learned and professional societies of India